Istgah-e Balarud (also Romanized as Īstgāh-e Bālārūd and Īstgāh-e Bālā Rūd; also known as Bālārūd) is a village in Hoseyniyeh Rural District, Alvar-e Garmsiri District, Andimeshk County, Khuzestan Province, Iran. At the 2006 census, its population was 38, in 11 families.

References 

Populated places in Andimeshk County